Coleophora semicinerea is a moth of the family Coleophoridae. It is found on the Canary Islands (Fuerteventura), Morocco, southern Europe (France, the Iberian Peninsula, Italy, Sardinia, Sicily, Greece, Crete and Cyprus) and Yemen.

The larvae feed on Colutea arborescens.

References

semicinerea
Invertebrates of the Arabian Peninsula
Moths of Asia
Moths of Africa
Moths of Europe
Moths described in 1859